Naag aur Nagin is a 2005 Pakistani supernatural drama film which was released on 31 December 2005. It was directed and produced by Jamshed Naqvi and written by Rukhsana Noor. The film features Saima Noor and Moammar Rana in leading characters of serpents along with Shafqat Cheema, Badar Munir, Veena Malik, Babar Ali, Irfan Khoosat and Tabinda. The plot of the film revolves around two serpents Sawak (Moammar Rana) and Beena (Saima) who have disguised into the form of human beings which effects their relationship when Sawak falls for a bubbly girl Farwa (Veena Malik) who belongs to an influential family.

Plot
The story revolves around Beena and Sawak as they become humans from snakes after being together for a century. After becoming a human, Sawak is working as a businessman where company's admin Changez has become his rival and wants to destroy his professional as well as his personal life. Later, Sawak deceives the love of his life Beena and seeks to attract Farwa which agitate Beena and she finds different ways to get Sawak back in his life. Farwa is a happy-go-lucky girl who is unaware of the secret that Sawak is basically a serpent. Farwa's childhood friend Saju secretly loves her but did not express his feelings in-front of her. 

After several failed attempts to destroy Sawak's life, Changez finally learns that he and Beena are serpents and tries to openly reveal this secret but loses his life during the process. In the end, Beena and Saju team-up and succeed to unite with their respective lovers, Sawak and Farwa.

Cast
Saima as Beena
Moammar Rana as Sawak
Shafqat Cheema as Changez
Babar Ali as Saju
Veena Malik as Farwa
Badar Munir as Dilbar Jan
 Tabinda as Shaadan
 Hina Khan
 Somia Ghazal
Irfan Khoosat
 Sweety Naz
 Sitara Awan

Music
The music director is M. Ashraf, while Rukhsana Noor, Saeed Gillani and Riaz ur Rehman Saghar have written the songs. A. Nayyar, Azra Jehan, Ameer Ali, Saira Naseem, Humaira Channa and Waris Baig are the film song singers.

References

External links
 

2000s Urdu-language films
Pakistani supernatural films
2005 films
Films scored by M Ashraf